The 1942 Texas Longhorns football team represented the University of Texas at Austin during the 1942 college football season.

Schedule

Awards and honors
Jack Freeman, Cotton Bowl co-Most Valuable Player
Roy McKay, Cotton Bowl co-Most Valuable Player
Stanley Mauldin, Cotton Bowl co-Most Valuable Player

References

Texas
Texas Longhorns football seasons
Southwest Conference football champion seasons
Cotton Bowl Classic champion seasons
Texas Longhorns football